Birth tourism is the practice of traveling to another country for the purpose of giving birth in that country. The main reason for birth tourism is to obtain citizenship for the child in a country with birthright citizenship (jus soli). Such a child is sometimes called an "anchor baby" if their citizenship is intended to help their parents obtain permanent residency in the country. Other reasons for birth tourism include access to public schooling, healthcare, sponsorship for the parents in the future, or even circumvention of China's two-child policy. Popular destinations include the United States and Canada. Another target for birth tourism is Hong Kong, where some mainland Chinese citizens travel to give birth to gain right of abode for their children.

In an effort to discourage birth tourism, Australia, France, Pakistan, Germany, Ireland, New Zealand, South Africa, and the United Kingdom have modified their citizenship laws at different times, mostly by granting citizenship by birth only if at least one parent is a citizen of the country or a legal permanent resident who has lived in the country for several years. Germany has never granted unconditional birthright citizenship, but has traditionally used jus sanguinis, so, by giving up the requirement of at least one citizen parent, Germany has softened rather than tightened its citizenship laws; however, unlike their children born in Germany, non-EU- and non-Swiss-citizen parents born abroad usually cannot have dual citizenship.

No European country presently grants unconditional birthright citizenship; however, most countries in the Americas, e.g., the United States, Canada, Mexico, Argentina, and Brazil do so. In Africa, Chad, Lesotho and Tanzania grant unconditional birthright citizenship, as do some in the Asian-Pacific region including Fiji, Pakistan, and Tuvalu.

Today

North America

The United States, Canada, and Mexico all grant unconditional birthright citizenship and allow dual citizenship. The United States taxes its citizens and green card holders worldwide, even if they have never lived in the country. In Mexico, only naturalized citizens can lose their Mexican citizenship again (e.g., by naturalizing in another country).

United States

The Fourteenth Amendment to the United States Constitution guarantees U.S. citizenship to those born in the United States, provided the person is "subject to the jurisdiction" of the United States. Congress has further extended birthright citizenship to all inhabited U.S. territories except American Samoa. (A person born in American Samoa becomes a non-citizen US national). The parent(s) and child are still subject to de jure and de facto deportation, respectively. However, once they reach 21 years of age, American-born children, as birthright citizens, are able to sponsor their foreign families' U.S. citizenship and residency.

There are no statistics about the 7,462 births to foreign residents in the United States in 2008, the most recent year for which statistics are available. That is a small fraction of the roughly 4.3 million total births that year. The Center for Immigration Studies, a conservative think tank, estimated in 2012 that there were approximately 40,000 annual births to parents in the United States as birth tourists. The center also estimated in 2012 that total births to temporary immigrants in the United States (e.g., tourists, students, guest workers) could be as high as 200,000.

Russian birth tourism to Florida to 'maternity hotels' in the 2010s is documented. Birth tourism packages complete with lodging and medical care delivered in Russian begin at $20,000, and go as high as $84,700 for an apartment in Miami's Trump Tower II complete with a "gold-tiled bathtub and chauffeured Cadillac Escalade."

One option for mainland Chinese mothers to give birth is Saipan, Northern Mariana Islands, where the cost is cheaper and travel does not require a U.S. visa. More than 70% of the newborns in Saipan have birth tourist PRC parents who take advantage of the 45-day visa-free visitation rules of the territory and the Covenant of the Northern Mariana Islands to ensure that their children can have American citizenship. There were 282 of these births in 2012. At least one airline in Hong Kong requests that women who are "observed to have a body size or shape resembling a pregnant woman" submit to a pregnancy test before they are allowed to fly to Saipan.

, Los Angeles is considered a center of the maternity tourism industry, which caters mostly to Asian women from China and Taiwan; authorities in the city there closed 14 maternity tourism "hotels" in 2013. The industry is difficult to close down since it is not illegal for a pregnant woman to travel to the U.S.

On March 3, 2015, Federal agents in Los Angeles conducted a series of raids on three "multimillion-dollar birth-tourism businesses" expected to produce the "biggest federal criminal case ever against the booming 'anchor baby' industry", according to The Wall Street Journal.

Numerous "maternity businesses" advise pregnant mothers to hide their pregnancies from officials and commit visa fraud—lying to customs agents about their true purpose in the U.S. Once they give birth, several 'birth tourism' agencies aid the mothers in defrauding the U.S. hospital, taking advantage of discounts reserved for impoverished American mothers. Some mothers will refuse to pay the bill for the medical care received during their hospital stay.

On October 18, 2014, the North American Chinese language Daily World Journal reported that for several weeks the immigration authorities at LAX had been closely questioning pregnant Chinese women arriving there from China, and in many cases denying them entry to the United States and repatriating them within 12 hours, often on the same airplane on which they had flown to the United States. In March 2015, federal agents conducted raids on a series of large-scale maternity tourism operations bringing thousands of mainland Chinese women intent on giving their children American citizenship. Congressional representatives such as Phil Gingrey, who have tried to put an end to birth tourism, said these people are "gaming the system". In August 2015, the issue was discussed among U.S. presidential candidates, including Donald Trump and Jeb Bush.

In January 2019, U.S. Immigration and Customs Enforcement investigations led to the arrest of three southern California operators of "multimillion-dollar birth-tourism businesses" catering primarily to Chinese nationals.

Effective January 24, 2020, a new policy was adopted that made it more difficult for pregnant foreign women to come to the US to give birth on US soil to ensure their children become US citizens.

Worldwide taxation of U.S. citizens and permanent residents

The United States and Eritrea are currently the only two countries in the world to tax their citizens worldwide, even if they have never lived in the country and were born to citizens living abroad.

A U.S.-born person is, as a citizen, automatically subject to U.S. taxation. This is true even if both parents are non-U.S. citizens, their child holds multiple citizenships, and the family leaves the U.S. right after the child's birth and never returns again. Children born to U.S. citizens living abroad are also automatically subject to U.S. taxation, even if he/she never enters the U.S.

U.S. permanent residents are also subject to worldwide taxation. Worldwide taxation is often cited as a reason for U.S. citizens or permanent residents to relinquish their citizenship or residency status.

Fee for renunciation of U.S. citizenship
In 2015, the fee for renunciation of U.S. citizenship was raised by 422%. It went from US$450 to $2,350 and is the highest fee for the renunciation of a citizenship worldwide.

Canada

Canada's citizenship law has, since 1947, generally conferred Canadian citizenship at birth to anyone born in Canada, regardless of the citizenship or immigration status of the parents. The only exception is for children born in Canada to representatives of foreign governments or international organizations. The Canadian government has considered limiting jus soli citizenship, and  continues to debate the issue but has not yet changed this part of Canadian law.

Some expectant Chinese parents who have already had one child travel to Canada to give birth in order to circumvent China's one-child policy, additionally acquiring Canadian citizenship for the child and applying for a passport before returning to China.

A Québec birth certificate entitles a student enrolled in that province to pay university tuition at the lower in-province rate; on average this was $3760/year in 2013.

Mexico

Mexicans who are citizens by birth are individuals that were born in Mexican territory regardless of parents' nationality or immigration status in Mexico. Individuals born on Mexican merchant or Navy ships or Mexican-registered aircraft, regardless of parents' nationality, are still considered Mexican citizens. Only naturalized Mexicans can lose their Mexican citizenship.

Birth (and abortion and other medical) tourism among the United States, Canada, and Mexico

In the Canada–US border region, the way to a hospital in the neighboring country is sometimes shorter than to a hospital in the patient's own country. So, Canadian women sometimes give birth to their children in U.S. hospitals, and U.S. women in Canadian hospitals. These children (sometimes called "border babies") are usually dual citizens of both the country of their parents and their birth country.

Canada has entered the medical tourism field. In comparison to U.S. health costs, medical tourism patients can save 30 to 60 percent on health costs in Canada.

Mexican women sometimes engage in birth tourism to the United States or Canada to give their children U.S. or Canadian citizenship.

While some non-legal obstacles exist, Canada is one of only a few countries without legal restrictions on abortion. Regulations and accessibility vary between provinces.

In the United States, different states have different abortion laws, so that women in states with restrictive laws sometimes engage in abortion tourism, either to the U.S. states with more liberal laws or to Canada.

South America

Most South American countries grant unconditional birthright citizenship and allow dual citizenship, but their strict abortion laws make them risky birth-tourism destinations in case of complications during the pregnancy. In Brazil, abortion is restricted to cases of maternal life, mental health, health, rape, or fetal defects. In Chile, abortion was forbidden completely, even if the pregnant woman's life is in danger until 2017. Current law allows abortion in Chile only if the mother's life is in danger, if the fetus is inviable and in rape cases.

Some countries do not allow their citizens to renounce their citizenship or only if the citizenship was acquired by birth there to non-citizen parents. In Argentina, Brazil, Ecuador, Peru, and Uruguay, voting is compulsory for citizens. In Bolivia, Brazil, Chile, Colombia, Cuba, Guatemala, Paraguay, and Venezuela, military service is mandatory.

Argentina
Any person born in Argentine territory acquires Argentine citizenship at birth, excepting children of persons in the service of a foreign government (e.g. foreign diplomats). This can be also applied to people born in the Falkland Islands, a disputed territory between Argentina and the United Kingdom. Argentine citizens cannot renounce their Argentine citizenship.

Brazil
A person born in Brazil acquires Brazilian citizenship at birth, regardless of their parents' ancestry. It is said Brazilian citizens cannot renounce their Brazilian citizenship, but it is possible to renounce it through a requirement made in the Brazilian consulate if they already have acquired another citizenship voluntarily. Foreign tourists, parents of a Brazilian child, may apply for permanent residency in Brazil based on their child's nationality.

Chile
As of 2019, for a child born in Chile to acquire Chilean citizenship at birth, it is necessary that the foreign mother or the foreign father be legally resident in Chile, previous to the date of birth. Also, children born of persons in the service of a foreign government (like foreign diplomats) are not Chileans.

Paraguay
Any person born in Paraguay territory acquires Paraguayan citizenship at birth. The only exception applies to children of persons in the service of a foreign government (like foreign diplomats).

Hong Kong

As a non-sovereign territory, Hong Kong does not have its own citizenship; the status akin to citizenship in Hong Kong is the right of abode, also known as permanent residence. Hong Kong permanent residents regardless of citizenship are accorded all rights normally associated with citizenship, with few exceptions such as the right to a HKSAR passport and the eligibility to be elected as the chief executive which are only available to Chinese citizens with right of abode in Hong Kong.

According to the Basic Law of Hong Kong, Chinese citizens born in Hong Kong have the right of abode in the territory. The 2001 court case Director of Immigration v. Chong Fung Yuen affirmed that this right extends to the children of mainland Chinese parents who themselves are not residents of Hong Kong. As a result, there has been an influx of mainland mothers giving birth in Hong Kong in order to obtain right of abode for the child. In 2009, 36% of babies born in Hong Kong were born to parents originating from Mainland China. This has resulted in backlash from some circles in Hong Kong to increased potential stress on the territory's social welfare net and education system. Attempts to restrict benefits from such births have been struck down by the territory's courts. A portion of the Hong Kong population has reacted negatively to the phenomenon, which has exacerbated social and cultural tensions between Hong Kong and mainland China. The situation came to a boiling point in early 2012, with Hong Kongers taking to the street to protest the influx of birth tourism from mainland China.

In the past (stopped by changes in laws)

Malta
Malta changed the principle of citizenship to jus sanguinis on 1 August 1989 in a move that also relaxed restrictions against multiple citizenships.

India
Because of an enormous population, India abolished jus soli on 3 December 2004. This was in response to the fear of having mass immigration from Bangladesh. Jus soli had already been progressively weakened in India since 1987.

India allows a form of "overseas citizenship", but no real dual citizenship.

Ireland

Irish nationality law conveyed birthright citizenship to anyone born anywhere on the island of Ireland (including in Northern Ireland, which is part of the United Kingdom) until the 27th Amendment was passed by referendum in 2004. The amendment was preceded by media reports of heavily pregnant women claiming political asylum, who expected that, even if their application was rejected, they would be allowed to remain in the country if their new baby was a citizen. Irish birthright citizenship could also serve for immigration purposes abroad: the case of Chen v Home Secretary involved a Chinese woman living temporarily in the UK who travelled to Belfast to give birth, for the purpose of using her daughter's Irish (and thus European Union) citizenship to obtain the permanent right to reside in the UK as a parent of a dependent EU citizen. Until 2004, Ireland was the last European country to grant unconditional birthright citizenship.

Ireland retains jus soli citizenship for people born anywhere on the island of Ireland with at least one parent who is (i) Irish; (ii) British; (iii) has the right to live permanently in Ireland or Northern Ireland (e.g. EU citizens); or (iv) has resided legally in Ireland or Northern Ireland for at least 3 of the 4 years preceding the child's birth (time spent as an asylum seeker does not count). The island of Ireland is expected to become an attractive birth tourism destination post-Brexit for British people from England, Wales and Scotland since the child is entitled to Irish citizenship and thus EU citizenship.

Dominican Republic
The constitutional court of the Dominican Republic reaffirmed in TC 168-13 that children born in the Republic from individuals that were "in transit" are excluded from Dominican citizenship as per the Dominican Republic's constitution. The "in-transit" clause includes those individuals residing in the country without legal documentation, or with expired documentation. TC 168-13 also required the civil registry to be cleaned from abnormalities going as far back as 1929, when the "in-transit" clause was first put in place in the constitution. The Dominican government does not consider it a retroactive decision but only a reaffirmation of a clause that has been present in every revision of the Dominican constitution as far back as 1929.

Encouraged by jus-soli countries (in the past)
In former times, some countries (Latin American countries and Canada) advertised their policy of unconditional birthright citizenship to become more attractive for immigrants.

Birth- and pregnancy tourism to non-jus-soli countries

Some women engage in birth tourism not to give their children a foreign citizenship, but because the other country has a better or cheaper medical system or allows procedures that are forbidden in the women's home countries (e.g. in-vitro fertilization, special tests on fetuses and embryos, or surrogacy).

But this may lead to legal problems for the babies in the home country of their future parents. For example, Germany, like 14 other EU countries, forbids surrogacy, and a baby born abroad to a foreign surrogate mother has no right to German citizenship. According to German law, the woman who gives birth to a baby is its legal mother, even if it is not genetically related to her, and if the foreign surrogate mother is married, her husband is regarded as the legal father.

Many women travel abroad only for some procedures forbidden in their home countries, but then return to their home countries to give birth to their children ("pregnancy tourism").

See also

 Anchor baby
 Economic results of migration
 Multiple citizenship
 Surrogacy

References

Immigration

Childbirth
Types of tourism